John de Montfort (died 24 June 1314), was an English noble. He was slain during the Battle of Bannockburn, Scotland in 1314.

William was the eldest son of John de Montfort and Alice de Plunch. He was killed fighting the Scots during the Battle of Bannockburn on 24 June 1314. He was succeeded by his younger brother Peter.

Citations

References

Barons in the Peerage of England
1314 deaths